Kimo Stevie Sampson (born 24 December 1994) is a Grenadian international footballer who plays as a forward for Grenadian side St. John's SC.

Career
Sampson started his career with youth side D L’Anse, where he won MVP at the 2009 Jason Roberts Foundation’s National under 16 competition and 'Most outstanding Midfielder' at the LIME Under 17 Cup.

International career
Sampson made his international debut in 2015 in a 2018 World Cup qualifying game, coming on as a 69th minute substitute for Jake Rennie in a 3-1 loss to Haiti. He took part in all of his nations 2017 Caribbean Cup qualification games, and scored the winning goal in a 2-1 victory over the U.S. Virgin Islands.

Personal life
As well as playing football, Sampson also sails, and competed in the 2015 edition of the Grenada Sailing Festival.

Career statistics

International

International goals
Scores and results list Grenada's goal tally first.

References

External links
 
 Profile at caribbeanfootballdatabase.com

1994 births
Living people
Grenadian footballers
Grenada international footballers
Association football forwards
Grenada under-20 international footballers
Grenada youth international footballers